Atherton Hall may refer to:

 Atherton Hall, Leigh, in Leigh, Wigan, Greater Manchester, England.
 Atherton Hall (Penn State), a Pennsylvania State University dormitory

Architectural disambiguation pages